Michelle may refer to:

People 
Michelle (name), a given name and surname, the feminine form of Michael

 Michelle Courtens, Dutch singer, performing as "Michelle"
 Michelle (German singer)
 Michelle (Scottish singer) (born 1980), Scottish winner of Pop Idol in 2003
 Michel'le, American singer

Arts, entertainment, and media

Music
 Michelle (album), a 1966 album by saxophonist Bud Shank
 "Michelle" (song), a 1965 song by The Beatles
 "Michelle", a song by Lynyrd Skynyrd
 "My Michelle", a 1987 song by Guns N' Roses
 "A World Without You (Michelle)", a 1988 song by Bad Boys Blue

Film
 Michelle (Marvel Cinematic Universe), a fictional character of the Marvel Cinematic Universe

Television
 "Michelle" (Skins series 1), a 2007 episode of the British teen drama Skins

Science
 1376 Michelle, an asteroid
 Hurricane Michelle, powerful 2001 Atlantic tropical storm

See also
Michael (disambiguation)
Michel (disambiguation)
Michele, a given name and surname
Nichelle